Fatty acid amide hydrolase 2 or FAAH2 (oleamide hydrolase 2, anandamide amidohydrolase 2) is a member of the serine hydrolase family of enzymes.

Fatty acid amide hydrolase 2 degrades  endocannabinoids and defects in this enzyme have been associated with neurologic and psychiatric disorders.

See also 
 Fatty acid amide hydrolase

References

External Links 
Fatty acid amide hydrolase 2 (FAAH2) The Human Protein Atlas
EC 3.5.1
Integral membrane proteins